Dorothy Ezard Bartlam (November 8, 1907 in Goole, Yorkshire – September, 1991 in Bournemouth, Hampshire) was an English actress.

Filmography
 A Woman Redeemed (1927)
 The Fake (1927)
 A Little Bit of Fluff (1928)
 Not Quite a Lady (1928)
 Afterwards (1928)
 The Flying Squad (1929)
 The Ringer (1931)
 Fascination (1931)
 Stranglehold (1931)
 Tin Gods (1931)
 The Love Race (1931)
 Her Night Out (1932)
 Watch Beverly (1932)
 Fires of Fate (1932)
 On Thin Ice (1933)
 The Fear Ship (1933)
 The Jewel (1933)
 Up for the Derby (1933)
 Call Me Mame (1933)

References

External links

1907 births
1991 deaths
People from Goole
English film actresses
English silent film actresses
20th-century English actresses